Breaking Hearts is the eighteenth studio album by English musician Elton John. It features the quartet of John, Davey Johnstone, Dee Murray and Nigel Olsson. There were four top-40 singles from the album: "Sad Songs (Say So Much)" (US #5/UK #7), "Who Wears These Shoes" (US #16), "In Neon" (US #38), and the UK No. 5 hit "Passengers".

Background
This album would be the last to feature all (core) members of the classic "Elton John Band" lineup playing their instruments (although they would reunite to provide backing vocals on John's Reg Strikes Back album).  It was the last of John's studio albums to feature bass from Murray, who would die in 1992 of skin cancer, and it was the last studio album until 2001's Songs from the West Coast that would feature Olsson on drums. It was also the last recorded album in which John played both piano and keyboards in the studio by himself. 

Breaking Hearts was also the first album since Victim of Love to not feature a string or horn section on any track. This is one of only two albums with John's classic band to which (unofficial member) Ray Cooper did not contribute at all, the other being 1973's Don't Shoot Me I'm Only the Piano Player. Shortly after the tour, the band line-up would change and Gus Dudgeon, John's former producer, would produce the next two albums. In the US, it was certified gold in September 1984 and platinum in August 1998 by the RIAA.

John has continued performing "Sad Songs (Say So Much)" as of 2022, as he included the song in his Farewell Yellow Brick Road Tour setlist. Apart from the 1984 Breaking Hearts Tour (both the European and the North American leg), no other songs from the album have been performed live except "Restless" and "Passengers", on the following 1985–1986 Ice on Fire World Tour (the latter song only performed on the UK leg).

Track listing

 Sides one and two were combined as tracks 1–10 on CD reissues.

Personnel 
Track numbering refers to CD and digital releases of the album.
 Elton John – lead and backing vocals, synthesizers (tracks 1, 2, 3, 5, 6, 7, 9, 10), pianos (tracks 3, 4, 5, 7, 8, 9, 10), Hammond organ (track 5), harmonium (track 6), Fender Rhodes (track 7), harpsichord (track 7), clavinet (track 10)
 Davey Johnstone – backing vocals (tracks 1–4, 6-10), electric guitar (tracks 1–3, 5, 7, 8, 9), acoustic guitar (tracks 2, 6, 7, 8, 10), sitar (track 9)
 Dee Murray – bass guitar (tracks 1–3, 5-10), backing vocals (tracks 1–4, 6-10)
 Nigel Olsson – drums (tracks 1–3, 5-10), backing vocals (tracks 1–4, 6-10)
 Andrew Thompson – saxophone (track 5)

Production 
 Chris Thomas – producer
 Renate Blauel – recording
 Tim Young – mastering (UK)
 Greg Fulginiti – mastering (US)
 David Costa – art direction, design
 Richard Young – photography
 Patrick Jones – band photography
 Herb Ritts – Bernie Taupin photo

Charts

Weekly charts

Year-end charts

Certifications

References

External links

Elton John albums
1984 albums
Albums produced by Chris Thomas (record producer)
Geffen Records albums
The Rocket Record Company albums
Albums recorded at AIR Studios